= Disaster Plan =

Disaster Plan are an Australian indie rock band from Melbourne featuring Richard Moffat and Michael Ruff. Formed in 1997, they have released six albums, toured nationally and been on rotation on Triple J.

== Discography ==
- Assembly Area #1 (1996)
- Evacuation Centre (1998)
- Recording: November 1999 (1999)
- Disaster Plan Party (1999)
- Party LP (2001) - Sensory Projects
- Self Help Guide (2002) - Sensory Projects
- Reality Correctors One Through Twelve LP (2004)
